Alessandro Bellemo (born 7 August 1995) is an Italian professional footballer who plays as a midfielder for Como, and of which he’s the captain.

Career

Bellemo began his career wearing the Padova shirt, playing with the Primavera team in the 2012/2013 season. In the 2013/2014 season he joined the first team in Serie B, and was assigned the number 2 shirt. After being benched against Palermo (coach Marcolin was on the bench) and Brescia (coach Mutti was on the bench), he made his Serie B debut with coach Michele Serena on the bench in Padova-Pescara 2-1, replacing Renato Kelic in the 72nd minute, and on the last day in Padova-Avellino 2-1, replacing Matias Cuffa in the 68th minute. Following the non-inclusion of Padova in the 2014/2015 championship, Bellemo was released and signed by Spal. In his first season with the Estensi he played on 5 occasions in Serie C, while in his second year he played on 13 occasions, winning a historic promotion to Serie B. In the 2016/2017 season he moves on loan to Alma Juventus Fano where he plays 35 games. He starts the 2017/2018 season at SPAL in Serie A, but not finding space, he moves on loan to Padova, returning to wear the biancoscudo after 4 years.

On 14 July 2019, he signed a 3-year contract with Como.

References

External links
 

1995 births
Living people
Association football midfielders
Italian footballers
Calcio Padova players
S.P.A.L. players
F.C. Pro Vercelli 1892 players
Como 1907 players
Serie B players
Serie C players
People from Chioggia
Sportspeople from the Metropolitan City of Venice
Footballers from Veneto